Matt McCarthy (born November 9, 1979 in Providence, Rhode Island) is an American comedian, actor, writer, and improviser living in Los Angeles. 
He is best known for appearances on Conan, The Pete Holmes Show and CollegeHumor.com and as host of the We Watch Wrestling Podcast. McCarthy co-stars as Carl on the  CBS show How We Roll.

Early life
Matthew McCarthy, the youngest of three, was born in Providence, Rhode Island at the old Women & Infants Hospital on Maude Street. He grew up in an Irish-Catholic home in Rumford, Rhode Island and attended St. Margaret's School and La Salle Academy.

Career
Described by The New York Times as a "John Belushi-like madman", McCarthy began performing standup comedy after graduating from
Fordham University where he was the mascot, The Ram, from 1999 to 2001.

Studied improvisation at the Upright Citizens Brigade Theater in Chelsea.

McCarthy is known for having red hair and, often, a beard. He portrayed The Cable Guy in a series of Verizon FiOs commercials.

Appeared as a contestant on an episode of the television show Cash Cab, which aired on June 26, 2006.

McCarthy hosted Action Pack on AMC with Nick Stevens.

Coined the phrase, "You have got some brass, son!" in a St. Patrick's Day commercial for Guinness.

Starred in multiple CollegeHumor shorts, including the Jeggings series, the Badman series and as Nicolas Cage's Agent, among others.

McCarthy co-founded the sketch video group Front Page Films. FPF made videos for Doritos, Crunch Fitness, CollegeHumor, and Comedy Central. FPF's HOTEL, DOCTOR and KID FARM series were featured on Atom.com and Comedy Central's Tosh.0.

From 2011-2012 and 2016-2018 worked as a creative writer with WWE.

Summer 2013, McCarthy, an avid pro wrestling fan, began recording episodes of the We Watch Wrestling Podcast with fellow stand-up comedians Vince Averill and Tom Sibley and producer Rob Sibley featured on iTunes New & Noteworthy page. Actor Gwyneth Paltrow is a frequent co-host on the podcast as of late 2022.

October 2013 through June 2014, McCarthy was a series regular and writer on The Pete Holmes Show on TBS following Conan.

Stand-up Comedy
Began performing comedy in New York City in 2003 at various open mics, barker shows, and bringer shows. Quickly found a home in the East Village at the now-defunct Comedy Social, a weekly comedy showcase at Sin Sin bar. Soon after, hosted a stand-up at Mo Pitkin's House of Satisfaction. McCarthy had a month-long run of his solo show "McCarthyism" at the infamous Rififi Cinema Classics. McCarthy also ran "The Matt McCarthy Stand-Up Comedy Show" at Comix NY for several months.

In 2011, McCarthy ran a monthly comedy extravaganza called MARKING OUT in Manhattan.

His standup comedy television performances include Season 3 of Live at Gotham, John Oliver's New York Stand Up Show' on Comedy Central.

McCarthy has performed at such festivals as Just for Laughs in Montreal, All Tomorrow's Parties, Sasquatch! Music Festival, Outside Lands Music and Arts Festival and Bonnaroo.

Named one of LA Weekly's Comics to Watch in 2014.

Discography
Come Clean (2010)
Pro Wrestling Fan (2016)
Sober Dad (2020)

Filmography

Film

Television

References

External links

Matt McCarthy's YouTube channel
We Watch Wrestling Podcast

1979 births
Living people
21st-century American comedians
Male actors from Rhode Island
American male comedians
Writers from Providence, Rhode Island